Irapuru is a municipality in the state of São Paulo, Brazil. Its population is 8,325 (2020 est.) in an area of 214 km². The elevation is 436 m.

References

Municipalities in São Paulo (state)